Robert Arthur Johnson (January 29, 1917 – October 7, 2000) was an American professional basketball player. He played in the National Basketball League for the Akron Goodyear Wingfoots in four games during the 1938–39 season.

References

1917 births
2000 deaths
Akron Goodyear Wingfoots players
American men's basketball players
United States Navy personnel of World War II
Basketball players from Pennsylvania
Guards (basketball)
People from Bellevue, Pennsylvania
Pittsburgh Panthers men's basketball players